Hampton Roads Executive Airport  is a public-use airport seven miles (11 km) southwest of Norfolk and northwest of Chesapeake, Virginia. It is privately owned by Virginia Aviation Associates, L.L.C.

Most U.S. airports use the same three-letter location identifier for the FAA and IATA, but Hampton Roads Executive Airport is PVG to the FAA and has no IATA code (IATA assigned PVG to Shanghai Pudong International Airport in China).

Facilities

In 2004 the airport had 86,805 aircraft operations, average 237 per day: 97% general aviation, 2% air taxi and <1% military. 203 aircraft were based at this airport: 73% single engine, 14% multi-engine, 8% helicopters and 4% ultralights.

References

External links 
Hampton Roads Executive Airport

Airports in Virginia
Transportation in Chesapeake, Virginia